Proctor Building may refer to:

in the United States (by state)
Proctor Building (Libertyville, Illinois), listed on the NRHP in Lake County, Illinois
Brown-Proctoria Hotel, Winchester, Kentucky, listed on the NRHP in Clark County, Kentucky 
Fort Proctor, Shell Beach, Louisiana, listed on the NRHP in St. Bernard Parish, Louisiana
John C. Proctor Recreation Center, Peoria, Illinois, listed on the NRHP in Peoria County, Illinois
Procter and Gamble Baltimore Plant, Baltimore, Maryland, listed on the NRHP in Baltimore, Maryland
O'Connor-Proctor Building, Victoria, Texas, listed on the NRHP in Victoria County, Texas

See also
Proctor House (disambiguation)